Mu-yeol is a Korean masculine given name. Its meaning depends on the hanja used to write each syllable of the name. There are 21 hanja with the reading "mu" and six hanja with the reading "yeol" on the South Korean government's official list of hanja which may be used in given names. One way of writing this name in hanja (호반 무 
hoban mu "bearer of arms", 세찰 열 sechal yeol "fierce") means, roughly, "bravery and fierceness in battle".

People with this name include:
Muyeol of Silla (604–661), 29th monarch of the Kingdom of Silla (Muyeol was his temple name; his personal name was Kim Chunchu)
Kim Mu-yeol (born 1982), South Korean actor
Ko Moo-yeol (born 1990), South Korean footballer

Fictional characters with this name include:
Park Mu-yeol, in 2012 South Korean television series Wild Romance

See also
List of Korean given names

References

Korean masculine given names